Nina Kossman (Russian: Нина Косман [Kosman]; born in Moscow, USSR) is a bilingual Russian-American author, short story writer, poet, memoirist, playwright, translator of Russian poetry, editor, and artist.

Life and career 
Nina Kossman was born in Moscow, emigrated from the Soviet Union in 1972, and spent some time in Israel, Ohio, Vermont, California, and Mexico; currently, she resides in New York. She has authored, edited, translated, or both edited and translated more than nine books in English and Russian. She is the recipient of an NEA (National Endowment for the Arts) fellowship  and grants from the Foundation for Hellenic Culture and the Onassis Public Benefit Foundation. Her work has been translated from English into French; Russian; Spanish; Hebrew; Persian; Chinese; Italian; Bulgarian; Danish; Albanian, Greek, and Dutch, while Behind the Border, her book of short stories about her childhood in the Soviet Union, has been translated into Japanese. In addition to writing in English (her second language), she writes poetry and prose in her first language, Russian, and has an extensive list of publications in major Russian-language journals, in and outside of Russia. 
In 2021, she became the founding editor of EastWest Literary Forum, a bilingual literary magazine, published in Russian & English.

Literary critic Cynthia Haven writes in The Brookhaven, in her review of Kossman's book “Other Shepherds": “Twenty years ago, critic Harold Bloom wrote to the young poet Nina Kossman to tell her that her “intensely eloquent” translations of the poet Marina Tsvetaeva manage to “capture the doom-eager splendor of a superbly gifted poet.” W.S. Merwin wrote that these are “direct, strong, audible translations,” adding, “I hear Tsvetaeva’s voice, more of it, and in a new pitch, which makes something clear in her poems that I had only guessed at".

Poet and literary critic Emma Lee writes in her review of Kossman's book “Other Shepherds": “Nina Kossman was born in Russia and is bilingual in Russian and English. Initially, she wrote in Russian because ‘English was the language I had to use in the outside world—at school, in the city, etc. Instead, my poems sprang from the interior world, and at that age, I resisted the outside world and created—possibly at the expense of a comfortable co-existence with my peers—a world of my own.’ The themes of alienation in Marina Tsvetaeva's poems spoke to Kossman's experience.” 

Canadian culture and literary critic Donald  Brackett writes about Kossman in his review of her book published in Critics at Large:
“Alienation and nostalgia are, of course, the bread and butter of most exiles, but in the case of Kossman, displaced in America during its own time of social and political upheaval (one hauntingly like our own era today), those emotional states, shared by the older poet, were intangibles that could potentially damage or even destroy a person if they gave in to them without resistance but which could, as Tsvetaeva herself so clearly demonstrated in a model manner, also transform themselves into the raw material for the art of poetry. Initially, consumed by and consuming what she called this “cocktail of nostalgia, alienation, and immersion in Tsvetaeva” enabled Kossman to embark upon the writing of her own poems, initially in Russian despite the fact that she was now living in English.” 

Russian literary critic and poet Daniil Chkonia writes in his introduction to Kossman's poems in Emigrantskaya Lira, a major Russian poetry journal: "Nina Kossman's poems … combine ancient Greek myths with modern sensibility…She skillfully interweaves historical/cultural layers with events of our time, creating her own picture of life, in its continuity and unity." 

Aleksey Sinitsyn, a Russian literary critic and novelist, writes in his review of the Russian edition of Kossman's novel: “...this is intellectual prose of outstanding artistic merit [...] The author manages to show subtleties of communication between the individual and the collective, the factual and the mythological, the historical and the personal, and to demonstrate the connection that makes the fate of an individual inseparable from the fate of her people."

Another Russian critic, Olga Bugoslavskaya, writes in her review of Kossman's novel "Queen of the Jews": “…our former compatriot Nina Kossman offers her own version of a love story, set against a backdrop of animosity. ... Her novel… is poetic, beautiful and stylistically original. It rehabilitates the concept of the literary use of ideology and points out a fatal mistake we all make when we begin to rely on common cliches, averting our eyes from reality.”

Early life and family 
Nina Kossman emigrated from the Soviet Union with her family in 1972 and came to the US in 1973.  Her father, Leonid Kossman, was a notable linguist, philologist, author of textbooks on German phraseology and English usage and grammar for Russian speakers, and journalist, who had emigrated from Russia twice (in 1918 and 1972). He managed to leave Riga (Latvia) three days before the occupation of Latvia by the Nazi army. All the remaining members of his family, including his wife (Teresa Jacobi) and mother (Ruth Brenson), perished in the Holocaust in Riga. Nina Kossman's maternal grandfather was killed by Stalinists during the Great Terror; his wife, Nina Kossman's maternal grandmother, was sentenced to a term in a GULAG camp as "a member of a family of an enemy of the people".  Nina Kossman's mother, Maya Borisovna Shternberg, was a notable biologist, whose career was cut down by Lysenkoism. Her paternal great-grandfather was Isidor Brenson, a notable physician and historian of Baltic medicine.

Selected Bibliography

Books 

 Poem of the End: Six Narrative Poems. Marina Tsvetaeva. Translated by Nina Kossman. Swindon, UK: Shearsman Books, 2021.
 “Other Shepherds” a book of original poems by Nina Kossman and translations of Marina Tsvetaeva's poems. New York: Poets & Traitors Press, 2020.
 "Queen of the Jews", a novel [NL Herzenberg, Nina Kossman's pen name]. London: Philistine Press, 2015. 2017. In Russian translation –Нина Косман. “Царица иудейская”. Moscow: Рипол / Ripol, 2019.
 "Gods and Mortals: Modern Poems on Classical Myths" anthology (editor). New York: Oxford University Press, 2001.
 “Behind the Border” New York: William Morrow, 1994. New York: HarperCollins, 1994 (hardcover), 1996.
 "Behind the Border" in Japanese. Tokyo: Asunaro Shobo, 1994.
 Poem of the End: Selected and Narrative Lyrical Poems of Marina Tsvetaeva. Translated by Nina Kossman. Ann Arbor: Ardis Publishers, 1998. New York: Overlook Press, 2004. New York: Abrams Press, 2009. Poem of the End: Six Narrative Poems. New York: Shearsman Books, 2021.
 По правую руку сна. Po Pravuiu ruku sna. Poems in Russian. Philadelphia: Побережье (Poberezh’e), 1996.
 In the Inmost Hour Soul. Vox Humana. Selected poems by Marina Tsvetaeva. Translated by Nina Kossman. Clifton: Humana Press, 1989.
 Перебои (Pereboi), Poems in Russian and English. Художественная литература, 1990. Нина Косман (Коссман) Moscow: Khudozhestvennaya Literatura, 1990.

Selected Poems in Anthologies 

 English translation of Kossman's poem "Like Lambs" (tr. by Mary Jane White) in "101 Jewish Poems for the Third Millenium", anthology ed. Nancy Carlson & M. Silverman. Ashland Press, 2020.
 Five poems in Russian Women Poets.  Modern Poetry in Translation
 Poems. An Anthology of Contemporary Russian Women Poets. Edited by Daniel Weissbort and Valentina Polukhina. University of Iowa Press, Iowa City, 2005
 Russian Women Poets, Modern Poetry in Translation, No. 20, King's College, London, 2002
 Four poems in Modern Poems on Classical Myths, an anthology of modern poetry based on classical mythology. Oxford University Press. New York, 2001. 
 Poems in Nuestra Voz / Our Voice, Anthologia del Comite de Escritoras del PEN Club Internacional, Salta, Argentina, 2001.
 Two poems in the anthology "The Gospels in Our Image". New York / San Diego: Harcourt Brace, 1995.
 Two poems in International Women Poets Anthology, LIPS, 1993.

Selected Poetry in Literary Journals 

 "Ismul, the Boy Warrior", Orpheus, Agamemnon's Shadow Speaks in Carmina Magazine, September 2021.
 Three Poems Trafika Europe/European Literature Network
 Poems in Fictional Cafe
 Poems in Vox Populi. 2021
 Poems in Vox Populi  2021  
 Poems in Vox Populi  
 Poems in Vox Populi  
 "One by One" in Another Chicago Magazine, 2021.
 Poems in The Cafe Review, Winter 2021 issue.
 Long Poem in Среда Moscow, Russia, 2020
 Four poems in Среда Moscow, Russia, 2020
 Poems in Word City Lit
 Texts in Eratio Postmodern Poetry
 “Flock” in Ekphrastic Review. 2020
 Poems in The Classical Outlook, Volume 95, Number 1.
 "Empty Rock" Seven poems in Live Encounters (January 2020).
  “See how they watch you” Seven poems in Live Encounters (December 2019).
 "Lament for Odysseus" Six poems in Live Encounters (September 2019)
 “Forever and Ever”, “ Show Cooled”, and “As I Pass Your Jail Door” in Unlikely Stories.
 A cycle of poems in “Why NiCHT?”, a trilingual literary journal (Vienna, Austria). #7, Spring 2018.
 “Shape of a Whisper” in Contemporary Verse 2. The Canadian Journal of Poetry and Critical Thinking, vol. 38, issue 4. Spring 2016.
 “Ismul the Boy Warrior” in Modern Poetry Review. Issue 2, March 2015.
 Four poems in Gods and Mortals: Modern Poems on Classical Myths. Oxford University Press, New York / Oxford, 2001.
 Two poems in Virginia Quarterly Review, vol.72, Number 2, 1996.
 Poems in The Connecticut Poetry Review, Volume 14, number 1, 1995.
 Poems in Prairie Schooner, Volume 70, Number 3, Fall 1996.
 Two poems in Quarterly West, No. 40, Summer 1995.
 Poems in Orbis, no. 89/90, Summer / Autumn 1993, Nuneaton, Warwickshire, UK.
 Two poems in International Women Poets Anthology, LIPS, Issue 17, 1993.
 Poems in The New Renaissance, Vol. VIII, No.2, 1989.
 Poems in Southern Humanities Review, Spring 1986.

Selected Short Stories in Literary Magazines 

 "Net-Neti" in The Best American Poetry Blog
 "About Queen Elizabeth in a Soviet Childhood" Cassandra Voices (Ireland) 

 "How I Tried to Unite the Parts of my Soul" in Asymptote
 “Sophie Choice and What I Understood about Profanation”Litro
 Three parables in Cassandra Voices (Ireland)

 Excerpt from a memoir about a trip to Ukraine. Transitions/Артикуляция
 "A Pupil's Revenge" "Whisky Blot"
 "Jaffa Oranges in Schönau Castle" in Pocket Samovar
 "Other People's Thoughts"  Mumbermag
 Nonfiction in World Literature Today
 Short story in Usawa Literary Review (Mumbai, India) 
 "Prodigy" in EastWest Literary Forum
 Three prose pieces in WordCityLit
 “Farewell to Old Gods" in Carmina Review
 "A Report Card" in The Common 
 "I Have no Proof, Except for the Story I Tell Everyone I Meet" in EastWest Literary Forum
 “About a Woman Who Was Glad She Was Born a Woman” and “Read Your Book” in Body.
 "Doll" and "Mother's Love" Word City Lit, 2021.
 "A Translator"
 * "Ochi" in Mumbermag, issue #2, 2020
 * * “A New Year’s Tree or Atheism in Communist Countries” in Mumbermag, issue #2, 2020  
 * * * “Two Dreams About Trump" in Mumbermag, issue #2, 2020
 An excerpt from "The Hasmonean Chronicle" in Word City Lit (December 2020)
 "Story About an Old Wall Rug" Ekphrastic Review
 "I owe my life to a bullet that pierced my father's skull," 'One day, as she was walking around her neighborhood...', and 'One woman decided to stop going to work...' in Unlikely Stories
 "Your Students or Your Customers" in PEN America.
 “Clockwatch” in Tin House, Vol. 5, Number 3, Spring 2004.
 “A Monthly Tea” in Confrontation, No. 72/73, Fall 2000/Winter 2001.
 Nuestra Voz / Our Voice, Anthologia del Comite de Escritoras del PEN Club Internacional, Salta, Argentina, 2001.
 Short Story in Art Times, June 2000.
 “Family Planning”  in Michigan Quarterly Review, Arthur Miller issue, University of Michigan, Fall 1998.
 “Spring, 1941” in Columbia, issue 29, 1998.  Short Fiction in Prism International, Vol. 36, No.2, Winter 1998.
 Short stories (translated into Dutch) in Horizon, Number 102, winter 1997–1998; Number 103, Summer 1998; Number 104, winter 1998–1999. Belgium.
 "The Episode” in The Threepenny Review, #71, Fall 1997.
 “Sergeichik” in Wind Magazine, Number 80, 1997.
 “Pen International, Volume XIV, Number 2, 1995 (winners of the UNESCO/PEN Short Story Award). London.
 “Enmeshed” in Mundus Artium, Volume XV, Numbers 1&2, 1985.
 “Enmeshed 1” in The New Southern Literary Messenger, Richmond, Virginia, Spring 1985.
 “A Talk, Taped” in Sepia, Cornwall, England, 1985.

Plays 

 “Foreign Gifts in Asymptote 
 “Водные процедуры” in Этажи (Etazhi)
 "Foreign Gifts""  in Off the Wall Plays. 
 Women Playwrights: The Best Plays of 2000. Smith and Kraus, 2001.
 “Mirror” was produced by (among others) Moonlit Wings Productions, Washington D.C., Pag Bol Productions, Ferny Grove State School, Queensland, Australia, 2018, etc.
 Monologues in "221 One-Minute Monologues for Women" Edited by Capecci and Ziegler Aston.
 “Foreign Gifts” was performed by “Global Female Voices”, London, April 2018; by The Ventura Court Theatre, Studio City, CA, March 1998.
 “Foreign Gifts” was produced by Theatre Arts Department, Virginia Tech University, Blacksburg, VA, in 2017.
 One-act plays (From Russia with Gum, The Road to City Hall, Miracles) were produced by The Theatre Studio, 1997–1998; “Miracles” was produced in New York, New Jersey, and London.

Art 

 Paintings in Live Encounters
 Paintings in Мастерская
 Sculptures in So to Speak
 Paintings in Новый Континент
 NER (New England Review)  Paintings in Inprnt
 Paintings in National Translation Month
 Paintings. Fine Arts America 
 Paintings. Nina Kossman's art on YouTube

Selected Exhibitions 

 Dreamscapes (2011)
 The World According to Deer (2012)
 Ancient Gods in Painting (2013)
 Metamorphosis of Soul (2017)
 Ita Est (2018)
 Paintings of Rebirth (2018)
 Dreams of a Refugee  (2019)

Gallery

References

External links 

 https://www.encyclopedia.com/arts/culture-magazines/kossman-nina
 Review of Kossman's book for young readers in Kirkus Reviews
 Dictionary of Russian Women Writers. (Kossman) Kosman, Nina: pp. 324-325
 Libraries / World Catalog. N. Kossman
 Bilingual magazine edited by Kossman
 Library of Congress Nina Kossman 
 Kossman's official website

American writers
American memoirists
Translators from Russian
American poets
Russian refugees
Writers from Moscow
Jewish American writers
Multilingual writers
Exophonic writers
Living people
Year of birth missing (living people)
21st-century American Jews
American people of Russian-Jewish descent
21st-century Russian writers
Jewish American artists
American artists
Russian-American culture
American dramatists and playwrights
Self-taught artists
Russian artists
Jewish artists
Jewish art
American art
Immigrants to the United States
Russian writers
American painters
Jewish painters
Russian painters